Vlaikidis Vlasios (born September 7, 1965) is a Greek professional basketball coach.

He is the former head coach of the Shimane Susanoo Magic in the Japanese B.League.

Head coaching record

|- 
| style="text-align:left;"|Iwate Big Bulls
| style="text-align:left;"|2011–12
| 26||7||19|||| style="text-align:center;"|Fired|||-||-||-||
| style="text-align:center;"|-
|- 
| style="text-align:left;"|Shimane Susanoo Magic
| style="text-align:left;"|2013–14
| 26||5||21|||| style="text-align:center;"|Fired|||-||-||-||
| style="text-align:center;"|-
|-

References

1965 births
Living people
Greek expatriate basketball people in Japan
Greek expatriate basketball people in Serbia
Greek basketball coaches
Iwate Big Bulls coaches
Shimane Susanoo Magic coaches
Sportspeople from Katerini